Pietralunga is a comune (municipality) in the Province of Perugia in the Italian region Umbria, located about  north of Perugia. As of 31 December 2004, it had a population of 2,343 and an area of 140.2 km².

Pietralunga borders the following municipalities: Apecchio, Cagli, Città di Castello, Gubbio, Montone, Umbertide.

History
As a small medieval town in Italy, it has many mentions by travelers and adventurers, dating back to 1000 A.D. It is also home to several ancient Roman ruins. According to history, St. Crescenziano was killed near the town's center. On 11 September 1334 Giovanni di Lorenzo de Picardie traveled through Pietralunga as part of the Ax Miracle of the Holy Face of Lucca.

Demographic evolution

References

External links
 Pietralunga.it/

Cities and towns in Umbria